The Detonator is a 2006 American action film directed by Po-Chih Leong. The film stars Wesley Snipes, Silvia Colloca, Tim Dutton and William Hope. The film was released on direct-to-DVD in the United States on April 25, 2006.

Plot
Undercover CIA agent Sonni Griffith (Wesley Snipes) travels alone to Romania to expose an arms dealer and stop the sale of a nuclear weapon. When the arms dealer is tipped off to Griffith's identity, he lands himself in prison. Griffith is quickly released by the CIA, only to be given a new mission: to escort a beautiful Russian woman named Nadia (Silvia Colloca) back to the United States.

Griffith soon learns that strong-willed Nadia is being hunted by the very arms dealer that he intended to destroy, but this evil dealer will stop at nothing to get the information out of Nadia that he needs: the location of the $30 million she has hidden that will buy him a nuclear bomb. As the leak within the CIA continues to expose the location and identity of Griffith and Nadia, they must fight the arms dealers to the death to save themselves and the world!

Cast

Production

Filming
It is set and filmed at Bucharest Romania, in 49 days, between June 30 and August 18, 2005.

Release

Home media
DVD was released in Region 1 in the United States on April 25, 2006, and also Region 2 in the United Kingdom on 18 September 2006, it was distributed by Sony Pictures Home Entertainment.

External links
 

2006 films
2006 action films
2006 direct-to-video films
American action films
American direct-to-video films
Direct-to-video action films
Films about the Central Intelligence Agency
Films about violence
Films produced by Donald Kushner
Films set in Romania
Films shot in Bucharest
Sony Pictures direct-to-video films
2000s English-language films
2000s American films